Synpalamides phalaris is a moth of the Castniidae family. It is commonly known from southern Brazil, Uruguay and Paraguay, but has also been recorded from northern Argentina and Trinidad.

The larvae feed on Guzmania and Bromelia species.

References

Castniidae
Moths described in 1793